Karandeyevka is a rural locality (a settlement) in Nikolskoye Rural Settlement, Bobrovsky District, Voronezh Oblast, Russia. The population was 50 as of 2010.

Geography 
Karandeyevka is located 15 km west of Bobrov (the district's administrative centre) by road. Sokolovsky is the nearest rural locality.

References 

Rural localities in Bobrovsky District